Astronoid is the second studio album by post-metal band Astronoid, released in 2019 by Blood Music.

Background
Astronoid's previous album Air, was a critical success, landing on several year end best of lists. After the band finished touring, they began working on their second album.

The album was announced in November 2018, with "I Dream in Lines" serving as the lead single. The album's second single, "A New Color", was released on January 11, 2019. Vocalist/guitarist Brett Boland said the following about the album "...encapsulates all the changes in our lives over the past couple of years. Astronoid is a testament to who we are as people, the music that consumes us, and the love in our lives. These songs hold a special place in our hearts and we hope that others can find the same solace in them that we have.”

The group toured in support of Between the Buried and Me and TesseracT to promote the album.

Reception

The album's vocal work drew several comparisons to the band Circa Survive. In a mid-year lookback, Loudwire named the album one of the best rock albums of 2019.

Track listing

Personnel
Astronoid
Brett Boland - vocals, guitars, drums
Daniel Schwartz - bass, synthesizers
Casey Aylward - guitar
Mike DeMellia - guitar

Production
Mixed by Brett Boland & Daniel Schwartz.
Mastered by Magnus Lindberg

References

External links

Astronoid at Bandcamp (streamed copy where licensed)

Astronoid albums